The 1986 Carlsberg Challenge was a non-ranking invitational snooker tournament, which took place between 15 and 17 September 1986. The tournament featured four professional players and was filmed in RTÉ Studios, Dublin, for broadcast on RTÉ.

Dennis Taylor won the tournament by defeating Jimmy White 8–3 in the final. Taylor received £12,000 from the total prize fund of £33,000 as winner.


Main draw
Results for the tournament are shown below.

References

Fosters Professional
Carlsberg Challenge
Carlsberg Challenge
Carlsberg Challenge